Statistics of Emperor's Cup in the 1946 season.

Overview
It was contested by 12 teams, and University of Tokyo LB won the championship.

Results

1st Round
University of Tokyo LB 6–1 Mazda
All Keio University 4–1 Urawa Club
Tokyo Shukyu-dan – (retired) 栃木師
All Waseda University 2–1 Shonan Club

Quarterfinals
University of Tokyo LB 3–2 All Keio University
Tokyo Shukyu-dan 1–6 All Waseda University
Kobe University of Economics Club 4–1 湯浅蓄電
学士クラブ 2–0 Kwansei Gakuin University

Semifinals
University of Tokyo LB 2–0 All Waseda University
Kobe University of Economics Club 1–2 学士クラブ
学士クラブ retired after Semifinals

Final
 
University of Tokyo LB 6–2 Kobe University of Economics Club
University of Tokyo LB won the championship.

References
 NHK

Emperor's Cup